This is a list of franchise records for the Atlanta Thrashers of the National Hockey League.

Franchise records

Franchise single season 

 † Ties are no longer an official NHL statistic since the end of the 2003–04 NHL season
 ‡ Overtime losses became an official NHL statistic in the 1999–2000 NHL season and replaced the 'tie' statistic beginning in the 2005–06 NHL season

Franchise single game

Streaks

Individual records

Career leaders 

‡ Before the start of the 2010–11 NHL season
† Minimum 50 games played
†† Minimum 500 shots against

Single season leaders 

† Minimum 20 games played
†† Minimum 400 shots against

Single game leaders

References

 Atlanta Thrashers All-Time Leaders
 Atlanta Thrashers Top 50 All-Time Scoring Leaders
 Atlanta Thrashers Single Season Player Records
 

Records
National Hockey League statistical records